Eduard Kübarsepp (8 April 1877 Mäksa Parish, Tartu County – ?) was an Estonian politician. He was a member of Estonian Constituent Assembly. He was a member of the assembly since 24 January 1920. He replaced Harald Normak.

References

1877 births
Members of the Estonian Constituent Assembly
Year of death missing